An Alphyn (from the Germanic word for "chaser" or "wolf"), also known as awfyn or alfin in older writings, is a rare heraldic creature. It is much like a heraldic tyger, but stockier and with tufts of hair covering its body, and also has a thick mane and long thin tongue. Another notable characteristic is its knotted tail, reminiscent of Celtic design and similar to that of the griffin. Sometimes it is depicted as having an eagle's or dragon's talons on its forelegs, other times they are cloven, like a goat's. Occasionally all four feet are depicted as having the claws of a lion. In English heraldry, the Alphyn was used as a heraldic badge of the Lords de la Warr, and also appeared on the guidon held by the knight in the Milleflour Tapestry in Somerset.

In England's second printed book, William Caxton's "Game and Playe of the Chesse" the chessmen now known as bishops are described instead as Alphyns, representing judges: "The Alphyns ought to be made and formed in manere of Juges syttynge in a chayer wyth a book open to fore their eyen."

See also
 Attitude (heraldry)
 Charge (heraldry)
 History of England

References

Heraldic beasts
Mythological hybrids